The National Vehicle Crime Intelligence Service (NaVCIS), formerly known as the Association of Chief Police Officers Vehicle Crime Intelligence Service (AVCIS) is a British police unit.

Originally set up and run by the Association of Chief Police Officers, it is responsible for combating organised vehicle crime and the use of vehicles in crime. AVCIS was formed in 2006 to replace the vehicle crime related functions of the National Criminal Intelligence Service which was disbanded with the creation of the Serious Organised Crime Agency and is based in Warwickshire.

NaVCIS works with a number of other agencies and private companies to maintain the downward pressure on vehicle crime which has seen it reduce by 50% since 2001.

See also
 National Police Chiefs' Council

References

External links 
 http://navcis.police.uk/

Association of Chief Police Officers
Borough of Rugby
Home Office (United Kingdom)
National law enforcement agencies of the United Kingdom
2006 establishments in the United Kingdom
Organisations based in Warwickshire
Organizations established in 2006
Science and technology in Warwickshire